Billie Jean King and Betty Stöve were the defending champions, but decided not to play together.

King and Rosie Casals defeated Stöve and Françoise Dürr in the final, 6–1, 4–6, 7–5 to win the ladies' doubles tennis title at the 1973 Wimbledon Championships.

Seeds

  Rosie Casals /  Billie Jean King (champions)
  Margaret Court /  Lesley Hunt (quarterfinals)
  Françoise Dürr /  Betty Stöve (final)
  Olga Morozova /  Virginia Wade (third round)

Draw

Finals

Top half

Section 1

Section 2

Bottom half

Section 3

Section 4

References

External links

1973 Wimbledon Championships – Women's draws and results at the International Tennis Federation

Women's Doubles
Wimbledon Championship by year – Women's doubles
Wimbledon Championships
Wimbledon Championships